Edwyn Sherard Burnaby (22 May 1830 – 31 May 1883) was a major-general and Conservative Party Member of Parliament (MP) for Leicestershire North from 1880 until his death. He served in the Crimean War.

Biography 
The son of Edwyn Burnaby and Anne Caroline Salisbury, Burnaby was educated at Eton College and in 1848 entered the Grenadier Guards, serving at Inkerman and in the Siege of Sebastopol. He was the brigadier-general of the British Italian Legion from 1855 to 1857.

Burnaby was appointed Honorary Colonel of the 1st Leicestershire Rifle Volunteer Corps in 1878.

He inherited Baggrave Hall, Leicestershire on the death of his father in 1867. In 1880 he was elected Conservative Member of Parliament for North Leicestershire together with Lord John Manners.

He married Louisa Julia Mary Dixie (1843-1881) on 29 August 1864 at St George's, Hanover Square. She was the daughter of Sir Willoughby Wolstan Dixie, 8th Baronet, of Market Bosworth. They had two children: Algernon Edwyn Burnaby (1867–1938), who married Hon. Sybil Cholmondeley (1871–1911), daughter of Hugh Cholmondeley, 2nd Baron Delamere, and Hilda Burnaby. He was a first cousin of Frederick Gustavus Burnaby and a great-uncle of Queen Elizabeth The Queen Mother through his sister Louisa Cavendish-Bentinck.

He died on 31 May 1883 in Brighton aged 53.

References

https://www.royalcollection.org.uk/collection/search#/1/collection/2500278/captain-edwyn-sherard-burnaby-1830-1883

External links 

 

British Army major generals
British Army personnel of the Crimean War
Conservative Party (UK) MPs for English constituencies
UK MPs 1880–1885
1830 births
1883 deaths
People educated at Eton College
Grenadier Guards officers
English landowners
19th-century British businesspeople